Michael Andrew Reidy (born April 2, 1991) is an American soccer player.

Career

College
Reidy played college soccer at Colgate University between 2009 and 2012.

During his senior year, Reidy also played for FC Buffalo in the National Premier Soccer League.

Professional
Reidy was selected in the fourth round (71st overall) by Sporting Kansas City in the 2013 MLS Supplemental Draft. However, he did not earn a contract with the Major League Soccer club.

He signed his first professional contract in March, 2013 with his home-town club Rochester Rhinos of the USL Pro.

References

External links
USL bio

1991 births
Living people
American soccer players
Association football midfielders
Colgate Raiders men's soccer players
People from Webster, New York
Rochester New York FC players
Soccer players from New York (state)
Sporting Kansas City draft picks
USL Championship players